2002 Sanfrecce Hiroshima season

Competitions

Domestic results

J. League 1

First stage

Second stage

Overall table

Emperor's Cup

J. League Cup

International results

Player statistics

Other pages
 J. League official site

Sanfrecce Hiroshima
Sanfrecce Hiroshima seasons